Galician–Asturian or Eonavian is a set of Romance dialects or falas whose linguistic dominion extends into the zone of Asturias between the Eo River and Navia River (or more specifically the Eo and the Frejulfe River). The dialects have been variously classified as the northeastern varieties of Galician, as a linguistic group of its own, or as a dialect of transition between Galician and Asturian, opinion upheld by the former president of the Academy of the Asturian Language (ALLA), José Luis García Arias.

The set of dialects was traditionally included by linguists as Galician-Portuguese or Galician, with some traits of the neighbouring Astur-Leonese linguistic group. Now, however, there is a political-linguistic conflict on the identity of the language between those who prioritise the mixed identity and those that continue to prioritise the Galician substratum. Supporters of the former, mostly in Asturias, identify Eonavian as part of a dialect continuum between the Asturian and Galician languages or even a third language belonging to Portuguese-Galician group spoken only in that area. Supporters of the latter, mostly in Galicia, identify it as just Galician and want for it the same level of protection as Galician has in Castile and Leon, which protects the dialects of El Bierzo (of which the westernmost varieties are usually classified as Galician) in cooperation with the Galician government.

Nomenclature
In 2007, the Academy of the Asturian Language accepted the term Eonavian to refer to the dialect.

Classification

From a philological point of view, the origin of the language is surely in the Galician-Portuguese language family, the dominant language in the northwest of the Iberian peninsula in the Middle Ages. That follows from an examination of the more than six hundred parchments preserved in the monastery of Villanueva de Oscos. An examination of the documents of the monastery, written from the late 12th to early 14th centuries, show a certain identity between this language and the Galician-Portuguese language.

For the early stage, there are only documented translations of copies of ancient Latin deeds that were beginning to be unintelligible to the common people, (v. AHN sec. clergy, carp. 1617, AHN, Sec Clergy, carp. No. 1617. 15, no. 2, Sec AHN clergy carp. 1621 No 15 etc.), and there would not be until the mid-13th century that the first original deeds were written in the Galician-Portuguese language. In the early 14th century, the oddness of this language with the rest of the galacoifonía, was noticed. The most of these developments were the result of the Castilian language advancement in the urban centres of the River Eo: Revoredo, Ribadeo and Castropol, such influence was more significant in the writings of the bishops' notaries of Oviedo in these villages, but if the influence of Castilian was growing in the urban centres, the manuscripts of the monastery notaries still kept the original features of this language, and others were added that then appeared.

Since 1865, when Aureliano Fernández Guerra y Orbe published the first texts of the monastery of Oscos, the enormous divergences with the rest of the Asturian cartularies and specifically with the Fuero de Avilés, of which many of these texts are contemporary, became evident. In this sense, Rafael Lapesa, when dealing with the evolution of "Western Asturian" during the High Middle Ages, expressly excluded from his study the region to the west of the river Navia because he considered that it did not present any speciality in relation to other Galician-Portuguese cartularies. Many subsequent studies have dealt with the specific features of the Galician-Portuguese languages found in this cartulary, particularly the conjugated infinitive or articles system.

The cartulary of Oscos is an essential landmark for understanding the evolution of the Galician-Portuguese language, but the monastery's influence was ended with the arrival of the Castillian congregation in 1511. That started another period of great economic and social growth of the monastery around the iron industries, but the installation of the reformed order ended the written language, until its re-emergence in the late 19th century.

Distribution
The area where the dialects are spoken includes the Asturian municipalities of Boal, Castropol, Coaña, Eilao, El Franco, Grandas de Salime, Pezós, San Martín de Ozcos, Santalla de Ozcos, Santiso de Abres, Tapia de Casariego, Taramundi, A Veiga, Vilanova de Ozcos, and partially those of Navia, Ibias, Villayón, and Allande.

Comparative table

(*) The lateral sound ʎ: Porcia River to Navia River. The lateral sound l: Eo River to Porcia River.

Diachronic evolution

Here is the evolution of the language, taking into account the Monastery of Oscos parchments:

Phonology

Vowels

The system of stressed vowels is similar to Galician since there are seven in both languages; it was used by Ramón Menéndez Pidal when he assigned this language to the group of Galician-Portuguese languages. The system is very stable. It does not find the alterations that can be observed by effects of metaphony in other regions of Galician phonetics.  Here are the vowels obtained by García García in the El Franco village and Fernández Vior in Vegadeo:
• ä Open central unrounded vowel: f1 =700 y f2 =1350 hz (FV); f1 =750 y f2 =1500 hz (GG)
 – a: Long open central unrounded vowel: f1 =870 y f2 =1463 hz (FV); f1 =800 y f2 =1537 hz (GG)
 –  Open front unrounded vowel: f1 =700 y f2 =1300 hz (FV); f1 =715 hz y f2 =1400 hz (GG)
 – ɑ Open back unrounded vowel): 
•  e Close-mid front unrounded vowel: f1 =450 hz y f2 =1900 hz (FV)
 – e Close-mid front unrounded vowel affected by front sound: f1 =475 hz y f2 =1700 hz (GG)
 – e Close-mid front unrounded vowel affected by back sound: f1 =525 hz y f2 =1800 hz (GG)
•  ɛ Open-mid front unrounded vowel: f1 =700 hz y f2 =1800 hz (FV)
•  o Close-mid back rounded vowel: f1 =490 y f2 =1015 (FV); f1 =500 y f2=1075 (GG)
•  ɔ Open-mid back rounded vowel: f1 =555 hz y f2 =1100 (FV): f1 =600 hz y f2 =1100 hz (GG)
•  i Close front unrounded vowel: f1 =337 y f2 =2300 (FV); f1 =400 y f2 =2600 hz (GG)
•  u Close back rounded vowel: f1 =350 y f1 =1185 (FV); f1 =400 y f2 =925 hz (GG)

As it was indicated by García García regarding unstressed vowels, "Unlike other areas of Galician phonetics, there are no relevant differences between open and closed -e- and -o- and the sound of variant pairs can be considered, each with their own archiphonemes, keeping the following system: -i-, E-, a,-O-, u.

There are three unstressed vowels in final position: -e-,-o-and-a -. There is the loss of the -o endings -ene and -inu, 'sen', 'fren', 'centen', 'allén', 'padrín', 'camín'..., an overall conservation "-e" syllables end, after '-ete' and 'ite' headquarters, 'rede', 'vide', 'parede', etc. It is clearer still in place names 'San Mamede', 'Nonide', 'Taladride'. It is also normal to conserve "-e" after "θ" like in 'couce, 'fouce', etc. On the other hand, under the influence of Castilian, 'salú', 'verdá', 'enfermedá', it has been lost The paragogic vowel -e- after liquids consonant appear very residually, Acevedo y Huelves cites 'carcele'. Final vowel -o- has disappeared in suffix -elo, in toponyms: 'Tol', 'Castropol', 'Boal', etc.

Until the 19th century, nasal vowels were a fairly common phenomenon throughout Eonaviego but today are very unusual.  Dámaso Alonso was the first in confirming the phenomenon, widespread in the nearby Ancares Mountains. M. Menéndez García finds nasality remains in Freixulfe and points in Villallón Village, y Celso Muñiz in the Valledor region, in the frontier with the Asturo-Leonese languages. These remnants of nasal vowels in Eonavian explain that the syllables ended in nasal coda are always opened, the necessary consequence of velarization, the stage prior to the formation of the nasal.

A change in unstressed vowels when absolute  enclitic position has labial consonant and vowel assimilation.

Regarding the unstressed vowels, as pointed out by García García, "Unlike other areas of the Galaicofonía, the relevant differences between open e-y-o and closed sounds can be considered such as variants of two separate couples archiphoneme, keeping to the following system-i-, E-, a,-O-, u.

As is clearly evident by García García, the nasalization of vowels preceding tonic or atonic to ensure –n- in coda "tamen", or situated between nasal consonants "mañá". Vowel lengthening occurs as a result by contractions: "vou à casa" or by compensation as a result of the loss of intervocalic nasal "machacan a 'llá/lá", "Que mañá' nos traiga un bó día de solín". The extension is also in the case of concomitant vowels, like in the proverb "A terra que da á ortiga".

Diphthongs
 Falling diphthong: 'couto', 'souto', 'cantou', 'deitou', 'cantei'...
 Anticipation of the "yod", like: 'naide', 'coiro', 'agoiro', 'cadeira'...
 No nasal diphthong at the end, as noted by Menéndez García as one of the benchmark isoglosses the speeches and Asturleonesas Galaicas.

Semivowels
 Unlike Galician-Portuguese and Portuguese, Eonavian, like Galician, tends to the abolition of semiconsonants, but it has evolved its own way, linked to treatment of nasality, such as the relative articles 'condo', 'contó' or the toponyms 'Sayane' (Saint John) and the names 'Xan'(John, 'Xanón' (Big John), etc.
 In Eonaviego, as in the rest of the Galaicofonía, is a tendency to anticipatory assimilation, but today, both Eonaviego and Gallego have a strong influence from Castilian. In both cases, the process does not extend beyond the influence by it: 'naide', 'beizo', 'coiro', 'caldeiro', 'ribeira', etc.

Nasal consonants

 Intervocalic vowels are lost. That fact is the argument of greater weight to those opposed to the theory of Astur-Galician, precisely because there is the curious fact that the phenomenon is accentuated in the municipalities close to the probable Eonaviegos West following a north-south trend is started in Portugal. The fact is manifested in the formation of plurals, on increases in the training of women, but especially in the loss of the nasal-palatal.
 The velarization of nasal vowels and deformation from n-falling.
 The evolution of group Latin nn > n.
 The retention of -mb-.
 The group m'l y m'n changes to m
 The loss of nasal-palatals, in diminutive feminine, vaquía, cousía, roupía, etc. and some masculines foucío, campío, en el sufijo -ieiro/a: cocieira, dieiro, mulieiro, etc.

Lateral consonants
 The retention of intervocalic lateral consonants: except in the most western counties, the trend is the maintenance of intervocalic -l, except in the cartulary of Villanueva de Oscos Monastery the tendency to the disappearance of the intervocalic -l- is like the rest of the Galician-Portuguese languages.
 The palatalization of the initial lateral and degemination absence of Latin "-ll-". Now, it occurs in only half the territory, but the examination of the Cartulary de Oscos confirm that this phenomenon was widespread in all Galician and Asturian counties from the River Eo and the Navia River.
 The velarization of "B'D" (cold, Dold, etc.), is now a very rare a phenomenon and absent from Huelves Acevedo García, who reported "coldo" and "codo", but it was widespread in the Oscos.

Evolution of the Latin groups
 The evolution -cl-, -pl- y -fl- to palatal dull sound is agreed about in western Bable and Galician since "che vaqueira" tends to be more fricative (š) than affricate (ć).
 The group -lt-, -ct- and -sc- evolved to it and ix.
 The gj, gi, j, nj, li, gl were palatised.
 The ss evolved to a palatal, dull fricative.
 The gy, -dy-, -sc- evolved to a palatal dull fricative.
 Liquid consonants after occlusives changed to vocalic sounds: oculu > òyo, vetulu > vèyo, apicula > abeya, tegula > tèya, flagrare > cheirar, agru > eiro, cathedra > cadèira.

Other phenomena
 Fricative occlusives became sharper than Asturian, even more than in Galician: 'louxa', 'vixo', 'dexobado', 'xardía', 'broxa', 'xebrar', 'xastre', 'ameixola', 'èixola'.
 Palatalization of x.
 Distinction between palatals, fricatives and laterals. García García proposes the following oppositions: 'callo' ('callar' verb), cayo ('caer' verb), rayo (meteorological phenomenon), rallo ('rallar' verb), etc.
 Neutralization of liquid pool, but that phenomenon is on the verge of disappearance.
 Retention of Latin -f-.
 Geminate ss evolved to a fricative: Latin passaru > Eonavian páxaro, Latin bassare > Eonavian baxar, etc.

Morphology

Verbs
 Verbal tenses: indicative present, imperfect, perfect, pluperfect simple, conditional future; subjunctive present and imperfect; Imperative, infinitive simple and conjugate, participle and gerund.
 The synthetic future the construction of the future tense is with the phrase verb 'haber' + pronoun + tense infinitive: "eiyes atizar" u otras "eivos dar", "y'a poñer", which are similar to others used in Galician-Portuguese to prioritise the personal pronoun to the desinence ending: atizaryes-ei, darvos-ei, poñerlle-a.
 The conjugated infinitive is used subordinate constructions if the infinitive ends or is part of a prepositional phrase; processes have different subjects and aims to avoid ambiguity.
 Like the rest of the family Galician-Portuguese, there is a strong dependence of original vocalism in Latin, and in Galician-Asturian, it is even more conservative. The verbal inflection of Eonavian is conditioned by the loss of the distinction between open and closed vowels in Vulgar Latin. The disappearance of the distinction between unstressed vowels made the mobility of stressed vowels within the verbal root make morpheme prevail over the root in most cases, distinguishing between open and closed position as tonic when it was combined.

Thus, the vowels acquired certain metaphonic connotations, to incorporate the distinction into verbal inflection and ignore the etymological origin of the words. The strong personal forms (the three person singular and third plural present indicative, subjunctive and all of the second imperative)  are always distinguished by speakers between vowel -e- and open-o and between the strong and weak of forms other than monosyllabic verbs if the stressed vowel of the root morpheme and the match, except for the verbs given duty and irregular in Galician-Asturian. These are the main features of the verb forms in the language:

The –des is in the second person plural of every conjugation. García García confirms that although the ending is maintained stably in the second and third conjugations, in the first conjugation, it is giving way to the influence of Castilian -ais and -aides.

The perfect past –che has in the first person singular, 'veño', 'teño', 'vexo'.

There is a vocal deformation by the  rizotónic effect.

Infinitive ending in -r- join with pronomes.

There is a disappearance of –s- in the first person plural to join 'nos' enclitic.

The -n- paragogic is in the first person singular perfect in all strong and bending double –er, -ir, dixen-, puxen, fun, salin, còmín.

Endings in -i often take -n paragójica: tomein, falein, subirein, falarein, hein, sein.

The open -e forms in the first person plural past (coyèmos, dixèmos) or the open o- in second and third person plural (fòmos, fòron).

The infinitive in –er- in many verbs in Castillian is in -ir: 'morrer', 'encher', 'ferver', 'render', etc., less frequently, the form hesitates: 'valir'/'valer' y 'tosir'/'toser'.

An alternation occurs -e- open and closed in verbs with-e-open rizotónica for which the -e- radical of the singular and the third person plural.

Foe verbs ending in in-cer, the first person singular present indicative and subjunctive present are treated as ces: ce lluzo, lluce, lluza, lluzas, lluza.

There is an alternation between open and closed in the thematic vowel tonic of most verbs in -er.

Closed -e- is typical for all persons in the plural of the perfect, six of pluperfect simple, all the imperfect subjunctive in the two series, and forms of the gerund and the first person future, in the first and second person plural present, the plural of the imperative of the first and second person plural of the future, both as in the hypothetical future-e.

Verbs (medir and sentir) show an alternation i/e in the root vowel: with -i-in the strong forms (forms in the singular and the third plural of the present, the singular imperative and all of the subjunctive) and -e-in the weak vowels.

Western Asturian occurs accentuates the first and second persons of the plural present subjunctive.

Garcia Garcia admit the existence of composite shapes with verb 'ter' as an assistant. However, that is more an approach particular of the authors on the morphosyntax of the compound forms than as the existence of their own specialty in Eonavian. For some scholars this fact is a result of the classification of perfects in resultatives and experientials, in Eonavian language the experiential perfect would only be expressed using the periphrastic form with "tener" verb (have). 

According to Timothty Gupton, Galician-Asturian does not use the passive with the verb "tener" like a semiauxiliary verb as frequently as other Galician-Portuguese languages,
yet goes on to mention two puzzling constructions in this variety of Galician
also spoken in the region Navia-Eo (a fala), which are formed with "has" + "ter" + participle and "habías" + ter + participle.

Nouns

 The gender and the number are o/a, os/as. These forms are altered the loss of intervolcalic -n-: ratois (mice), caxois (drawers).
 The instability of nasal consonants alters also augmentatives and diminutives: casúa (big house), pedrúa (big stones), casía (small house), pedría (small stone), etc. Diminutive distinguishes four forms: masculine singular -ín "guapín", masculine plural -íos "guapíos", feminine singular -ía, "guapía", and feminine plural -ías, "guapías". In medieval Eonavian the nasalised forms with -ĩ- were preserved, and in some cases have been preserved until recent times in toponymy.
 It is also characteristic of Eonavian to change gender to specify a group or an unknown number of things: "el anada", "el herba", ("a herba" a blade of grass, "el hierba", a grass farod) and in adverbial locutions to "da feito" (in fact), "da remoyo" (soacking), etc.
 Although the neuter gender forms are very widespread, as Frías Conde points out, the use of the forms comes from the influence of Castilian, and the forms used to be unknown in Eonavian,.

Syntax

Pronouns
 The Latin vocalism of the first-person pronoun, albeit with different embodiments, is retained: èu/èo.
 There is a general extension of prepositional contractions of a similar nature. Contractions of unstressed pronouns, accusative dative are used more: mo, ma, mas, cho, cha, chas, yo, yos, yas.
 The accusative and the dative in the personal pronouns are distinguished: the second person is te/che, the third person ye/lo/la. Pronominal form «min» is always a complement with a preposition: a min, por min, de min, etc.
 Use of an interest dative: Eso nun che me gusta nada, vouchéme fer un traxe, llevábachebos un traxe, éche grande, vaiye cansao: the pronomes "che"- and –"ye"- have a sympathetic or interest value to highlight the attention of the recipient of the action. However, the indirect object lost the condition when it is preceded by the reflexive indirect object.
  The lack of reflexive complement.is replaced by different forms: ye: yo, ya, yos, yas, así: deoyo, llevayo, etc.

Partitives
 Retention of prepositional syntagma partitives (accusative partial) in restrictive clauses or specification of content with transitive verbs.

Prepositions
 A, agá, ante, ata, acía, baxo, cara, con, contra, de, dende, en, entre, escontra, menos, pra, prantre, por, según, sen, xunta, tras/tres.

Chartulary

One of the most relevant aspects of the language is the study of its evolution in the Middle Ages through the parchments which are kept in the Villanueva de Oscos Chartulary, the fourth most important in Asturias after San Pelayo, San Vicente and the Oviedo Cathedral. It is very interesting its conservation by the massive information provided a community so small as the Villanueva de Oscos Abbey. The documents show us the vitality of this language in the Middle Ages and give very important information on Romance languages in the northwest of Iberian Peninsula. The Chartulary preserves 616 parchments about the Middle Ages: 32 from the 12th century, 261 from the 13th century, 224 from the 14th century and 99 from the 15th century.

The first scholar who dealt with its study was Aureliano Fernández-Guerra in 1865, in the very important article «Speech about the Carther of Aviles». He used extracts of 19 documents from 1256 to 1316. In 1868, Martín Sangrador y Vitores included in his work about the Asturias administration a copy in Galician of the royal prerogative given away by Fernando II to the Abbey. The next edition of the documents about monastery had to wait until the mid-20th century, when the Royal Institute of Asturian Studies (RIDEA) edited the article «El convento benedictino de Villanueva de Ozcos» by Marcos G. Martínez, a rather poor edition. Only in 1981, Pedro Floriano Llorente publishes in RIDEA «Colección dipolomática de Villanueva de Ozcos», which implies an important improvement concerning the previous, both by perfection technical, as by the personal and toponymic references.

Nonetheless, the edition dealt with the issue only as far as 1200. In 1994, the Britonia journal published the second serial of the monastery's parchments, edited by Floriano Llorente, covering until the first half of the 13th century. The edition, however, failed to meet the editors' expectations.because no documents were produced in Romance so Britonia published a second version, less known, to covers until 1300, more interesting for the study of the question.

The works served as a basis to publish another set of documents by Professor Alvárez Castrillón in his book Los Ozcos en los siglos X-XIII, un modelo de organización social del espacio en la Asturias medieval, (2001), but the work addresses only the historic aspects and not the linguistics. In the following years, Professor Sanz Fuentes has published also four other documents with regard to Buron Hospital. Finally, Alvárez Castrillón, edited, in 2008, 605 more parchments as attachments to the book «La Comarca de los Oscos en la Edad Media, poblamiento, economía y poder», and in 2011, he edited 293 more documents from 1139 to 1300, Colección Diplomática del Monasterio de Santa María de Villanueva de Oscos, (1139–1300).

The documents of the chartulary give important information for knowledge of the language spoken in the western Asturias in the Middle Ages. They show the origin and the evolution of this language, but the serial of parchments finishes with the arrival the Congregation of Castile in 1511 at Monastery, the end of a cycle and will be the beginning of a new one, the big economic growth around the iron industry. However, the installation of the reformed order closed the documental history of this language, until its resurgence in the late 19th century.

Sample texts

 (River Eo)

Variants according to ALPI 
Here are the results by ALPI quiz in the 1930s in regard to the following points placed among Eo and Navia rivers and the general rule set out for all the region by Acevedo y Fernández in the first dictionary of the language, published in 1932.

Literature
The first known writer in Eonavian language perhaps could be Fernan Soares de Quiñones or Quinhões dos cancioneiros, a troubadour of the last third of the 13th century. He was the author of four songs of moral satire, known as (cántigas de escarnio y maldecir). One of the cántigas relates, in ancient Galician-Portuguese language, to the "costumes" (manners) and "feituras" (facts) of the "Cavalon" (old horse), which tells the adventures of a nobleman who lived in Seville, and had come from Oscos Region in "Esturas" (Asturias) on the border with Galicia. The verses are included in a "cántiga" that is within the theme of "escarnio" (ridicule) and "maldecir" (cursing) but with the impersonation which is typical of the "Cántiga de amigo" (friend song). Anyway, it seems that the reference to the knight of Oscos presents allegorical connotations to the origin of the Asturian knight that might be related with the type of speech used in the cantiga.

After the arrival of the Castillian Congregation at the monastery of Santa María de Villanueva de Oscos in 1511, the written record of the language ended until its resurgence in the late 19th century.

In the early years of the 20th century was an identification with Galician, reflected in authors like Cotarelo Valledor and Antolin Santos Ferraria, who wrote entirely in Galician. Fernandez and Fernandez and Bernardo Acevedo Huelves were the first authors who are aware of the peculiarities of this language. The latest one is usually attributed the first sonnet in this language:  "Vusté era un gran señor, Eu era un gran probe"(You was a great lord, I was a large poor man). A poet contemporary of them was Ramón García González, (1870–1938), who showed the influence of the modernist spirit, prevailing in the early 20th century. His best-known work is a long poem entitled "El xardín". Another poet in that time was Villar Conrado Loza (Taramundi 1873-Tapia 1962), who focused on themes around migration, recurring theme in folk literature on the early 20th century.

After the Spanish Civil War was a decline of the literature in Asturian Galician, which lost the identity features that were beginning to appear. Folk literature was mixing Galician and Castilian and tended to be anecdotic rather than purely literary. In the 1970s, thanks to the work of authors such as Damaso Alonso, writers of the western end of Asturia began to reaffirm the identity of their language, such as Manuel Garcia Sanchez, known Manolo Galano, particularly concerned about the popular culture of the region and published, in 1994, with Jacinto López Díaz "Vocabulario da Roda" and had published in 1984:  "Cuentos Parzamiques". He was a frequent contributor to the magazine Entrambasauguas and published, in 2005, a recast of twenty written contributions to the magazine in the book "Vento d'outono". Beside them are some more recent authors as Xose Miguel Suarez (Mantaras, Tapia, 1965) and Xavier Frias Conde. The writers started their literary careers, from the philological study of the language albeit from very different perspectives.

The difficulty of publishing books for an audience so small makes it most remarkable of all that the literature projects through various magazines of the region. The oldest magazine is "A Freita", which appeared in eleven numbers, a general magazine that started to being published in 1992. Among its contributors were writers like Benigno Fernandez Braña, Xan Castañeira, Xosé Maximo Fernandez Muniz, Adela Valledor Conde, etc. In 1995, the magazine attached a literary supplement, published to makes noticed to the authors of Eonavia in other formats, through a kind of less formal book.

Since 1996, the Department of Linguistics of Eo Navia has published the magazine "Entrambasauguas". Among the writers often to collaborating are Veiguela Crisanto (Vegadeo 1959), Alejandro Blanco Antunez, (Navia 1933), Teresa Lopez, (Boal 1950), Xoxe Carlos Alvarez Blanco, Xavier Vilareyo (Mieres 1967), Fredo de Carbexe (El Franco 1967), etc.

In theatre, there is some tradition like in Villar and Manuel Galano. Lately, old plays have been recovered: "Condo el cariño è de Verdá", a comedy released in 1936 by Association Armal, and "El tratto de FF Arias", premiered in Figueras in 1926.

Associations

In the dialectal area are associations supporting each side, such as Asociación Abertal (defending the Galician theory) and Xeira or Fala Viva (defending the Asturian theory). Its protection and language policy are the responsibility of the Asturian government and the Secretaría Llingüística del Navia-Eo, a division of the Academia de la Llingua Asturiana responsible for the area. There are two different orthographies for Eonavian, the official one (more Asturian-like) as well as one made by the Mesa prá Defensa del Galego de Asturias (more Galician-like).

See also
Iberian languages

Notes

References

External links
 Eonavian grammar (Galician theory)
 Mesa for the defense of Gallego de Asturias (defending the Galician theory)
 Xeira (defending the Asturian theory)

Galician language
Asturian language